Sékou Sanogo (January 1, 1921 in Dioulassoba, Bobo-Dioulasso – 1962) was an Ivorian politician, leader of the Parti Progressiste, who served in the French National Assembly from 1951–1955.

References

External links
 1st page on the French National Assembly website
 2nd page on the French National Assembly website

1921 births
1962 deaths
People from Bobo-Dioulasso
People of French West Africa
Ivorian politicians
Rally of the French People politicians
Deputies of the 2nd National Assembly of the French Fourth Republic